Liam Sullivan (May 18, 1923 – April 19, 1998) was an American actor and singer, originally from Jacksonville, Illinois. He began acting while a student at Illinois College and continued in theater at Harvard University. In 1951 he began his career on Broadway appearing in The Constant Nymph.

Career
Sullivan appeared mostly in television roles during his career. In the mid-1950s, he appeared on the religion anthology series Crossroads. Sullivan and Angie Dickinson appeared together in the episode "Point of Honor" of the syndicated American Civil War drama series The Gray Ghost. He guest starred as Jason Douglas in the 1960 episode "The Target" of the syndicated western series Tombstone Territory.

In 1961–62, Sullivan made three guest appearances on Perry Mason, including the 1962 episode "The Case of the Unsuitable Uncle" and in each episode played the murder victim.
He portrayed Patrick Henry in the Daniel Boone episode "Love and Equity", scientist Anthony Sterling in the Voyage to the Bottom of the Sea episode "Leviathan", Nexus in the Lost in Space episode "His Majesty Smith", an army lieutenant in the episode "The Winter Soldier" on Rawhide, Mr. Willis in Knots Landing, Dr. Burt Hammond in St. Elsewhere, and Mr. Plenn in Falcon Crest. In 1966, he portrayed Terrence O'Toole in an episode of Bonanza ("The Dublin Lad"). He also appeared as Dr. Tolvar in a 1976 episode of Hawaii Five-0 ("The Capsule Kidnapping").

He played the prosecuting attorney in the "Hill 256" episode of Combat! In the Dragnet episode "The Big Prophet" (1968), Sullivan as his character Brother William (a thinly disguised portrayal of Timothy Leary) held forth for the entire half-hour on the benefits of LSD and marijuana while Joe Friday argued the opposing view. Sullivan played a similar role on a 1970 episode of Adam 12 as a con artist/cult leader.

In 1966–67 season, he appeared as Major Mapoy in all twenty-six episodes of the ABC Western series The Monroes with Michael Anderson, Jr., and Barbara Hershey. He appeared in films such as That Darn Cat! (1965) as Graham and The Magic Sword (1962). 

In 1966, Sullivan guest starred opposite William Shatner on Gunsmoke, playing “Benjamin Ellis”, a Quaker forced to hide a gunman in S12E12’s “Quaker Girl”. Two years later he was back with Shatner, this time performing the role of Parmen, a supremely arrogant and cruel telekinetic alien, in the Star Trek episode "Plato's Stepchildren" (1968). He was also featured in the Twilight Zone episodes "The Changing of the Guard" and "The Silence". In the latter episode, which aired in 1961, he played a youngish and overly loquacious member of a gentleman's club who accepts a challenging and rather bizarre bet offered by an older member of the club (played by actor Franchot Tone) that ends in unintended consequences. In the former episode, which aired a year later in 1962, Sullivan played the headmaster of a private boarding school who must deliver the bad news to an "aging out" teacher, played by Donald Pleasence.

Telepathy was the subject of experiments Sullivan conducted in the documentary film from 1977 called The Amazing World of Psychic Phenomena hosted by Raymond Burr. Sullivan often portrayed villains throughout his acting career. He once said, "Playing truly evil people is a great way to release tension and anger and disgust with humanity. Show bad people what they really look and act like and maybe they'll recognize themselves and change. Who knows?"

Death
Sullivan died Sunday, April 19, 1998, in Los Angeles of a heart attack at the age of 74. He had recently completed a role in Mike Nichols's production of The Little Foxes. When he died, Sullivan was working on two books: a novel and the history of his family's Eli Bridge Co., which was credited with constructing one of the first Ferris wheels. He was interred at Diamond Grove Cemetery in his native Jacksonville, Illinois.

Filmography

Film

Television

References

External links
 
 
 
 

1923 births
1998 deaths
Harvard University alumni
Male actors from Illinois
People from Jacksonville, Illinois
Burials in Illinois
Male actors from Los Angeles
American male television actors
American male film actors
20th-century American male actors
20th-century American singers
20th-century American male singers